Heroes in Hell is a 1974 Italian Macaroni War film written, directed and lensed by Joe D'Amato (using the pseudonym "Michael Wotruba" for the directorial credit), produced by Walter Brandi and starring Klaus Kinski, Luciano Rossi and Franco Garofalo.

Plot
A group of American POW's escape from a vile Nazi prison camp in Germany during World War II. They escape into the countryside, pursued by a squadron of Nazi soldiers assigned to recapture them. The Americans join forces with a group of French freedom fighters, and agree to help them kidnap the high-level German general Kaufmann from his chateau. Using German uniforms captured in combat, the men succeed in capturing the general, but when he puts up a fight they are forced to tranquilize him and physically carry him out of the building. The Nazi platoon catches up with them and a firefight ensues, killing almost everyone on both sides. The last surviving Americans succeed in escaping with their unconscious prisoner.

Cast
 Lars Bloch as Capt. Alan Carter
 Ettore Manni as Bakara, the drunken doctor
 Klaus Kinski as SS-Brigadeführer Kaufmann
 Luciano Rossi
 George Manes as German Lt.
 Carlos Ewing
 Rosemarie Lindt as Maria 
 Lu Kamante as Lt. Duncan
 Luis Joyce as Julian's Sister in Law 
 Christopher Oakes as Bunny Segar
 Stan Simon as Lt. Stain 
 Dick Foster as German Comandant 
 Edmondo Tieghi as Pratt 
 Luigi Antonio Guerra as Julian 
 Roberto Dell'Acqua as Julian's Brother 
 Paul Muller as German Soldier 
 Attilio Dottesio
 Pietro Torrisi as Van co-driver (uncredited)

Production
D'Amato had directed Kinski earlier in Death Smiles on a Murderer (1973) and said Kinski "(was) an excellent professional actor."

Release and distribution
In Italy, the film received a limited regional release in very few cinemas and only for a short time, premiering on 27 November 1974. The film was shown on the Italian regional TV station Tele Video TVR on 15 November 1980.

In August 1985, the English dub Heroes in Hell was distributed by "Lightning Video" as Nr. 7502 for the price of $69.95.
A VHS of the Italian dub was published by "Shendene & Moizzi" in 2000. In July 2007, Heroes in Hell was released on DVD under the title Hrdinové v pekle by the Czech label "Řitka video, s.r.o." containing both the Czech dub and the Italian dub with forced Czech subtitles. This edition was reissued by Řitka in 2009 and 2012. Also in 2007, a DVD of the English dub was released in South Africa by "Impact Video".

Bibliography

References

External links

Heroes in Hell at Variety Distribution

1974 films
1970s Italian-language films
Italian World War II films
Films directed by Joe D'Amato
Macaroni Combat films
Films about the French Resistance
1970s Italian films